Daughter of Sinbad or Sindbad ki Beti is a 1958 Indian Hindi-language film directed by Ratilal. It stars Nadira, Paidi Jairaj, Pran, Kamal Kapoor, S. N. Tripathi, Jeevankala. It had music by Chitragupta, with lyrics penned by Prem Dhawan and Anjum Jaipuri. It was produced by Starland Productions.

Plot
As Sinbad the Sailor was returning home with a shipload of treasures, he vanished and was presumed to be lost in the wilderness. His daughter Shabnam (Nadira) set out to search for him, and when she reached the "Island of Halem Alah", she ran befoul of the island's King who was himself under control of his own Vizier. She and the king's heir fall in love as it develops that Sinbad was a captive of the Vizier. The Vizier had been torturing Sinbad to learn the secrets of his treasure.

Cast

 Nadira
 Jairaj
 Pran
 Kamal Kapoor
 S. N. Tripathi
 M. H. Douglas
 Heera Sawant
 Jeevan Kala
 Maqbul
 Maruti

Soundtrack

References

https://www.cinemaazi.com/film/daughter-of-sindbaad

External links
 Daughter Of Sindbad at the Internet Movie Database
 Daughter Of Sindbad at the Bollywood Movie Database

1950s Hindi-language films
Films scored by Chitragupta